"He's Just No Good for You" is a song by Australian pop rock band Mental As Anything, released in July 1987. It was released as the second single from the band's sixth studio album, Mouth to Mouth. The song was written by Mental As Anything guitarist Greedy Smith and peaked at number 15 on the Australian charts.

Track listings

Personnel 

 Martin Plaza – lead vocals, guitar
 Wayne de Lisle – drums
 Reg  – guitar, vocals
 Greedy Smith – lead vocals, keyboards, harmonica
 Peter O'Doherty – bass guitar, vocals

Charts

Weekly charts

Year-end charts

References 

Mental As Anything songs
1987 songs
1987 singles
CBS Records singles
Epic Records singles
Songs written by Greedy Smith
Song recordings produced by Richard Gottehrer